Grazhdanskaya Oborona (Russian: Гражданская оборона), Russian for Civil Defense, or ГО, often referred to as ГрОб, Russian for coffin) were a Soviet-Russian rock band formed by Yegor Letov and Konstantin Ryabinov in Omsk, USSR, in 1984. They were one of the earliest Soviet and Russian psychedelic/punk rock bands. They influenced many Soviet and, subsequently, Russian bands. From the early 1990s, the band's music began to evolve in the direction of psychedelic rock and shoegaze, and band leader Yegor Letov's lyrics became more metaphysical than political.

History

Formation and early years 

In 1982 the 18-year-old poet and musician Yegor Letov formed the band Posev (The Sowing, named after the official NTS magazine) with his friend Konstantin "Kuzya UO" Ryabinov. In 1984 Posev became Grazhdanskaya Oborona. The band was preparing to record an album, but their defiantly anti-authoritarian stance and overtly political lyrics made them an easy target for the KGB. "The mother of our [second guitarist] Babenko, she was a sort of a party official, she listened to our records and went to the KGB and said, "Comrades, my son is involved in an anti-Soviet organization", Letov recalled. In autumn 1985 Letov was committed to a mental ward, and Ryabinov was forcibly drafted into the army despite having a heart condition. Letov was released from the mental ward in March 1986 and immediately began to write and record music. He often recorded on his own, and while he credited other musicians, his collaborators went under pseudonyms as Letov remained on the outs with the Soviet system and, as he stated in an interview, the original members of GrOb were forced to sign sworn statements saying that they would stay away from Letov. In 1986–87 he recorded several cassette albums, playing all instruments himself, and released them through magnitizdat under the name of Grazhdanskaya Oborona. It was lo-fi, straightforward garage punk rock/post-punk with slight reggae influences and exquisite, irrational lyrics, inspired mainly by Russian Futurist poetry.

1987–1990 

In 1987 Letov was invited to perform at the Novosibirsk rock festival. "We weren't even going to play", Letov said, "but Zvuki Mu didn’t come and Murzin suggested that we play instead.". After all, he played a set with his friends Oleg and Evgeny Lischenko (from the local band Pik Klakson) under the deliberately provocative name Адольф Гитлер (Adolf Hitler), which would be released on CD in 2016. When Letov returned home, he found out the authorities were going to put him to a mental ward again. He immediately left the city with his then-partner, the fellow Siberian songwriter Yanka Dyagileva, and spent the entire year in hiding, hitch-hiking across the country until the prosecution was stopped in December 1987 with the help of Letov's relatives.

In winter 1988 Letov returned home and recorded three more albums (also released under the name of Grazhdanskaya Oborona) in his home "studio", known as "GrOb Records". In the same year the reunited band started touring across the USSR.

In 1989 Grazhdanskaya Oborona released four noise rock/industrial-influenced albums (Война, Армагеддон-Попс, Здорово и вечно and Русское поле экспериментов), often considered their best. Letov's lyrics became darker and more elaborate, inspired by Existentialist philosophy and literature (the Soviet proto-Existentialist writer Andrei Platonov in particular). Some songs (e.g. "Насекомые" (Insects) from Армагеддон-Попс, "Заговор" (Spell) from Здорово и вечно) also show his interest in Siberian folklore and pre-Christian beliefs. In the same year Letov, Kuzya and Oleg "Manager" Sudakov started a conceptual, Sots Art-like side project Коммунизм (Communism), where they combined kitschy Soviet art and Stalinist poetry with noise experimentation. GrOb also collaborated with Yanka Dyagileva, who recorded with them two albums (Ангедония и Домой!, both released in 1989).

In 1990, Grazhdanskaya Oborona broke up after playing their final concert in Tallinn: Letov stated he was afraid they would turn into a "commercial pseudo-counterculture project" and decided to put the band on hiatus. After that he started the psychedelic rock project Egor i Opizdenevshie with Kuzya and Igor Zhevtun. They recorded and released two albums, Прыг-Скок (Pryg-Skok, Hop-Hop) and Сто лет одиночества (Sto Let Odinochestva, One Hundred Years of Solitude) (an outtakes compilation, Психоделия Tomorrow, was released in 2001). In 1990, Letov ranked Русское поле экспериментов and Прыг-Скок as his best works.

1993–1997 

In 1993, Grazhdanskaya Oborona reformed and began playing live again, but no new material was released until 1997. In 1996, their entire discography was remastered and given an official cassette issue for the first time on the fledgling XOP label, which was a sublabel of Moroz Records used to release Letov-related material. In 1995, the anthemic, shoegaze-y Solntsevorot was recorded, followed by Nevynosimaya lyogkost bytiya in 1996. Both albums were released in 1997.

As the most prominent figure in Siberian rock, Letov was often a source of contradiction. In the early 1990s, he became one of the founders of the nationalistic, leftist National Bolshevik Party, despite his formerly strong opposition to despotism and nationalism. He ceased contact with the party around 1999 and distanced himself from politics. In his 2007 interview with Rolling Stone Russia, Letov stated: "In fact, I have always been an anarchist – and I still am. But now I'm more into ecological aspects of contemporary anarchism, eco-anarchism, that's what I've been moving toward recently".

In 1999, after their first US tour, Kuzya left the band due to personal circumstances. On 28 December of the same year, the group's guitarist Evgeny "Makhno" Pyanov died after falling from the window of his apartment after a long night of drinking. He was 27 years old. Letov recruited a new guitarist (Alexander Chesnakov) and invited his wife Natalia Chumakova, whom he had met the year before, to play the bass.

2000–2008 

In 2002, Letov produced Zvezdopad, an album of covers of Soviet-era songs. In the 2000s, many Russian groups recorded and performed tributes to GrOb, and in 2005, the group toured the United States. In 2004–05, the group released the critically acclaimed pair of albums Dolgaya Schastlivaya Zhizn''' (2004) and Reanimatsiya (2005).

On 8 February 2004, at a GrOb concert at the Ural Palace of Culture in Ekaterinburg, a 19-year-old skinhead bashed a 23-year-old non-Slavic fan to death. The following day, Letov posted a note on the official GrOb website, "Official statement from E. Letov and GrOb regarding the events at Ekaterinburg", stating the band were "patriots, but not Nazis", disavowing any neo-Nazis who claimed to be fans of the group, linking neo-Nazism to the communism the band had grown up with and telling "totalitarians on the left and right and of all colours and stripes" to "fuck off", saying "We kindly request you no longer associate your stink with our activities".

Letov's last album, Zachem Snyatsya Sny? was released in 2007. In an interview in January 2008, Letov said that this album might be his last. This album was recorded as usual in the "GrOb studio", but is not typical of the band's earlier output. It is much brighter – Letov described it as "shining". There are fewer songs with themes of tragedy, rage and turmoil on this album than in previous ones; there are no coarse words in it, and Letov's voice sounds natural and calm.

Letov died on 19 February 2008 in his sleep at his home in Omsk from heart and respiratory failure. He was 43 years old.

 2019–2020 
In 2019, the group reformed and announced a tour to celebrate its 35th anniversary, with Letov replaced by various collaborators, such as Igor Zhevtun (who substituted for Letov on some songs on Instruktsiya po vyzhivaniyu due to Letov having lost his voice), Oleg Sudakov (who managed Kommunizm) and Ryabinov.

The final concert of the tour took place on 23 February 2020 at the Glastonberry club in Moscow. This also proved to be Ryabinov's final public appearance – he died of a stroke several weeks later on 16 March, aged 55.

 Musical style 

While their earlier work (1984–1988) can be described as minimalist lo-fi punk rock/post-punk with dirty, garage sound (although there also was significant number of reggae songs on 1987/88 albums), in the late 1980s the band's sound leaned toward noise rock and industrial, occasionally drawing inspiration from Russian folk tunes. In the 1990s, GrOb's music became brighter and more "anthemic", incorporating shoegaze and psychedelic rock elements, and some late GrOb albums even can be classified as art rock (for example, Zvezdopad).

Letov was a big fan of 60's garage and psychedelic rock and named Arthur Lee's Love as his favourite band, along with The Seeds, The Monks and others. Other favourites included Butthole Surfers, The Residents, Sonic Youth, CBGB artists such as Ramones and Television, and Psychic TV. In the February 2007 web interview he said that in the late 80's he "listened only to noise and industrial – such bands as Einstürzende Neubauten, Test Dept., Throbbing Gristle, SPK, Young Gods", adding: "Now I still like and 'respect' such music and listen to it from time to time, but not that often". When asked about "newer" bands he liked, he named Japanese psychedelic bands Acid Mothers Temple, Mainliner and Green Milk from the Planet Orange, the Swiss feminist cabaret ensemble Les Reines prochaines, the Argentinian experimental band Buscando a Reynols and the neo-garage band Marshmallow Overcoat. He referred to Mark E. Smith (of The Fall), Bob Dylan, Arthur Lee and Patti Smith as his favourite rock lyricists.

 Lineup 

 2019–2020 lineup 

Igor "Jeff" Zhevtun – vocals, guitar (1988–1989, 1989–1990, 1993–2000, 2004–2005, 2019–2020)
Konstantin "Kuzya UO" Ryabinov – bass, guitar, keyboards, percussion, vocals, backing vocals, noise effects (1984–1985, 1988, 1989–1990, 1993–1999, 2019–2020)
Alexander "Phantom of the Opera" Andryushkin – percussion (1994, 1997–2005, 2019–2020)
Alexander Chesnakov – guitar, keyboards (2000–2008, 2019–2020)
Sergey Letov – saxophone (2000–2004, 2019–2020)

 Past members 
Yegor Letov – vocals, guitar, percussion, noise effects (1984–2008)
Natalia Chumakova – bass, keyboards (1997–2008)
Pavel Peretolchin – percussion (2005–2008)
Andrey "Boss" Babenko – guitar (1984–85)
Valery "Val" Rozhkov – flute (1986)
Oleg "Baby" Lischenko – guitar, vocals (1987)
Evgeny "Eugene" Lischenko – bass, vocals (1987)
Igor "Jeff" Zhevtun – guitar (1988–1989, 1989–1990, 1993–2000, 2004–2005)
Arkady Klimkin – percussion (1988–90)
Oleg "Manager" Sudakov – vocals, backing vocals (1988; also one of the founding members of Kommunizm)
Yanka Dyagileva – backing vocals (1988, 1989, 1990)
Dmitry Selivanov – guitar (1988)
Evgeny "John Double" Deev – bass (1988)
Igor Starovatov – bass (1988)
Sergey Zelensky – bass (1989)
Alexander "Ivanych" Rozhkov – flute (1993)
Arkady Kuznetsov – bass (1994)
Evgeny "Makhno" Pyanov – bass, guitar (1995–1999)
Anna Volkova – bass, keyboards, electric fiddle, backing vocals (1995–1997)
Evgeny "Jackson" Kokorin – guitar (1997)

 Discography 

 Film 
 I Don't Believe in Anarchy, Documentary, RUS/CH 2015, Dir.: Anna Tsyrlina, Natalya Chumakova

References

External links

Grazhdanskaya Oborona
Myspace page for the band, includes a detailed history written in English accompanied by a discography, photographs and samples of their music.
Excerpts from the 1990 interview with Периферийная нервная система fanzine, published in Maximumrocknroll'' in 1991 (in English)
 Film-Website for I Don't Believe in Anarchy  
 Grazhdanskaya Oborona lyrics

Russian punk rock groups
Musical groups established in 1984
Musical groups disestablished in 2008
Russian alternative rock groups
Noise rock groups
Anarcho-punk groups
Post-hardcore groups
Russian psychedelic rock music groups
Musical quartets
Soviet punk rock groups